This is a list of Scottish football transfers, featuring at least one 2018–19 Scottish Premiership club or one 2018–19 Scottish Championship club, which were completed during the summer 2018 transfer window. The Scottish leagues continued with the standard deadline of 31 August, while other leagues such as those in England and Italy brought forward their deadlines to the start of their league seasons.

List

See also
 List of Scottish football transfers winter 2017–18
 List of Scottish football transfers winter 2018–19

References

Transfers
Scottish
2018 in Scottish sport
2018 summer